Michael Qureshi (born 4 May 1976 in Køge) is a Danish journalist.

In December 2015 he was dismissed and expelled from the Danish newspaper Ekstra Bladet, when it was revealed that Qureshi had used fake sources for several years. Subsequently, well over 500 articles from various media in Denmark withdrawn when the credibility of these could not be corroborated.

It was Michael Qureshi as in the summer of 2015 wrote the first biography of the Norwegian football player Martin Ødegaard. It was published by the Norwegian publisher Publicom.

Bibliography
 Martin Ødegaard, Michael Qureshi, Publicom, 2015

References

1976 births
Living people
People from Køge Municipality
Danish journalists
21st-century Danish biographers
Male biographers